Redeemer Baptist Church is a Baptist Christian church formed in 1974 when around 30 families broke away from Castle Hill Baptist Church in Sydney, Australia, to form their own church. It was headed for much of that time by Ps. Noel Cannon who died in 2012.

Crisis
In 2004, 35 church members left the Community. There were claims of control by church leaders, the Nine Network reported. One of the original founders of the Church, Alan Nutt told the Channel Nine network:  "I think the control has resulted over the years in very serious damage to many many lives, both young people and old people ... ," The Church strenuously denied allegations of being a cult. In addition there were claims made by Channel Nine, that the school controlled by the Church owed 14 of their teachers six million dollars in unpaid wages. The Church was mentioned in the NSW Parliament on a large number of occasions in the affirmative  and in the negative.

Following negative comments made by Greens MLC Dr John Kaye in the NSW Parliament, Russel Bailey, elder of Redeemer Baptist Church submitted a citizen's right of reply to the NSW Parliament.

In 2008, a settlement was reached between the school and Grahame Glossop, one of the critics of the school. Glossop stated, "I am very happy that we were able to bring the litigation between the school and myself to a final conclusion. I believe this has been a very stressful period for all concerned. It is regrettable that the relationship we once shared when my daughter attended your school has deteriorated over time. I hold no ill feeling against you the school, or any other parties related to this matter. My only concern now is to get on with my life and put the past four years behind me...I wish you and the school all the best now and into the future."

Leadership transition
The Redeemer Baptist School named their library the NF Cannon Library in tribute to the founding principal in August 2011.

Noel Cannon died on 25 February 2012 with tribute being paid to Cannon in NSW Parliament.
Noel Cannon was succeeded by his son Jonathan as the principal of the School and leader of the Church.

Commendations
On 23 November 2021, Dr GEOFF LEE (Parramatta—Minister for Skills and Tertiary Education), stated in NSW Parliament: "The Redeemer community must be commended for its great work." "I commend Redeemer for its passion, for delivering great education and for earning a fantastic reputation in our local community."

References

Churches completed in 1974
Baptist churches in Australia
Churches in Sydney
1974 establishments in Australia